Plusiinae is a smallish (for noctuid standards) subfamily of the moth family Noctuidae. As the Noctuidae appear to be a paraphyletic assemblage, the Plusiinae may eventually be raised to family status (Weller et al. 1994).

Comparison of Eurasian species

References 
  (1994): Phylogeny of noctuoid moths and the utility of combining independent nuclear and mitochondrial genes. Systematic Biology 43: 194–211.

External links 

 Markku Savela's Lepidoptera and some other life forms: Plusiinae. Version of 2007-MAR-15. Retrieved 2007-JUN-03.

 
Noctuidae